Conlen is an unincorporated community in Dallam County, Texas, United States, located along U.S. Route 54. Founded in 1903, the town was named after Spanish–American War veteran, Captain J.H. Conlen. It is home to the famous "Big Tex" statue.

"Big Tex" Statue 
Not to be confused with the "Big Tex" statue in Dallas, Texas, "Big Tex" is a tourist attraction in Conlen, Texas, United States. It is a 20 foot tall statue of a cowboy with bow-legs. The statue dates back to the 1950s when it was the entrance to the Cowboy Cafe, a restaurant with a museum and gift shop located in Dalhart. The current owner of the statue is Elliot Crabtree. His father moved it from Dalhart to Conlen in the 1960s.

References

 
 

Unincorporated communities in Dallam County, Texas
Unincorporated communities in Texas